Luis Enrique Del Pino Mago (born 15 September 1994), known as Luis Mago, is a Venezuelan footballer who plays as a centre-back for Argentine Primera División side Banfield and the Venezuela national team.

International career

International goals
Scores and results list Venezuela's goal tally first.

References

External links
 

1994 births
Living people
People from Cumaná
Venezuelan footballers
Venezuela youth international footballers
Venezuela international footballers
Venezuelan expatriate footballers
Association football defenders
Deportivo Anzoátegui players
Carabobo F.C. players
Club Deportivo Palestino footballers
Universidad de Chile footballers
Ñublense footballers
Club Atlético Banfield footballers
Venezuelan Primera División players
Chilean Primera División players
Argentine Primera División players
Expatriate footballers in Chile
Expatriate footballers in Argentina
Venezuelan expatriate sportspeople in Chile
Venezuelan expatriate sportspeople in Argentina
2019 Copa América players
2021 Copa América players
21st-century Venezuelan people